We Are Your Friends may refer to:

 We Are Your Friends (Simian album), a 2002 album by Simian
 "We Are Your Friends" (song), a 2006 song by "Justice vs Simian"
 We Are Your Friends (film), a 2015 film